Autosticha dayuensis is a moth in the family Autostichidae. It was described by Kyu-Tek Park and Chun-Sheng Wu in 2003. It is found in Jiangxi, China.

The wingspan is 11–12 mm. The forewings are pale orange, scattered irregularly with blackish scales. There are three well-developed discal stigmata, the first at the middle, the plical below it, the second beyond the cell. There is a series of fuscous dots from the middle of the costa along the termen and the tornus is suffused with fuscous scales. The hindwings are grey.

References

Moths described in 2003
Autosticha
Moths of Asia